Diogo Fesnard Nogueira de Sousa (born 16 September 1998) is a Portuguese footballer who plays as a goalkeeper for Turkish club Bodrumspor on loan from Antalyaspor.

Football career
Born in Albufeira on the Algarve, Sousa joined Sporting CP's academy in 2014. On 6 May 2018, he made his professional debut with the reserve team in a 1–0 LigaPro win away to Vitória S.C. B. The reserve team was then dissolved and reconstituted as an under-23 team, and he signed a new three-year contract in May 2019.

Sousa had his initial call-up to Sporting's first team for the UEFA Europa League group game at home to PSV Eindhoven on 28 November 2019, remaining an unused substitute as fellow academy player Luís Maximiano was fielded.

On 30 June 2021, without having debuted for Sporting's first team, Sousa signed a four-year deal at Antalyaspor in the Turkish Süper Lig. While Belgian veteran Ruud Boffin played the league fixtures, Sousa made his debut in the third round of the Cup on 28 October, a 5–0 home win over Diyarbakırspor.

On 5 September 2022, Sousa joined Bodrumspor on a season-long loan with an option to buy.

References

External links

1998 births
People from Albufeira
Sportspeople from Faro District
Living people
Portuguese footballers
Association football goalkeepers
Sporting CP B players
Sporting CP footballers
Antalyaspor footballers
Liga Portugal 2 players
Süper Lig players
TFF First League players
Portuguese expatriate footballers
Expatriate footballers in Turkey
Portuguese expatriate sportspeople in Turkey